Malaysians in the United Kingdom are British citizens who have full or partial Malaysian origin or descent and Malaysian citizens residing in the United Kingdom. The 2001 UK Census recorded 49,886 Malaysian-born people. The 2011 census recorded 62,396 people born in Malaysia living in England, 2,117 in Wales, 4,721 in Scotland and 705 in Northern Ireland. The largest concentrations of Malaysian-born residents were recorded in Greater London (21,209 people) and South East England (11,331). The Office for National Statistics estimates that 75,000 Malaysian-born expatriate were resident in the UK in 2017.

In December 2008, it was reported that over 30,000 Malaysians who entered the UK temporarily had overstayed their visas. In 2013, there were 14,500 Malaysians studying at tertiary level in the United Kingdom, making Malaysians one of the largest overseas student groups in the United Kingdom and making the United Kingdom the country with the 2nd most Malaysian students.

Notable people
This is a list of Malaysian expatriates in the United Kingdom and British citizens of Malaysian origin.
 Arul Suppiah - Cricketer
 Amelia Thripura Henderson - Actress, model and television host
 Tash Aw - Author
 Ungku Abdul Aziz - Academic
 Betty Boo - Singer
 Jason Pomeroy -  British-Malaysian architect
 Jimmy Choo -  Shoe designer
 Henry Golding - Actor, model and television host
 Stephen Rahman-Hughes - Actor
 Syed Adney Syed Hussein - Footballer
 Sultanah Helen Ibrahim - Malaysian royalty
 Raja Petra Kamarudin - Politician
 Sybil Kathigasu - The only Malayan woman to be awarded the George Medal for bravery
 Shaun Maloney - Footballer
 Sherson Lian - Malaysian chef and television host
 Norman Musa - Chef/Restaurateur
 Ida Nerina - Actress
 Nigel Ng - Comedian
 Julia Rais - Actress and Malaysian princess
 Zuleikha Robinson - English actress and singer
 Elaine Tan - Actress
 Phil Wang - Comedian
 James Wong - Ethnobotanist
 Pik-Sen Lim - Actress
 Christina Jordan - British politician

References 

Asian diaspora in the United Kingdom
 
Islam in the United Kingdom
Britain United Kingdom
Muslim communities in Europe
Immigration to the United Kingdom by country of origin